This is a complete list of national teams in women's association football, arranged alphabetically within their confederations.

AFC (Asia)

 
 
 
 
 
 
 
 
 
 
 
 
 
 
 
 
 
 
 
 
 
 
 
 
 
 
 
 
 *
 
 
 
 
 
 
 
 
 
 
 
 
 
 
 

* Not a FIFA member.

 Brunei,  Oman, and  have no national teams despite being AFC and FIFA members.

CAF (Africa) 

*

*

* Not a FIFA member.

 has no national team despite being CAF and FIFA member.

CONCACAF (North and Central America and Caribbean)

 
 
 
 
 
 
 
 
 
 
 
 
 
 
 
  Match in 2014
 
 
 *
 
 
 
 
 
 *
 
 
 
 
 
 
 
  Match in 2022
 
 
 
 
 

* Not a FIFA member.

 Bonaire,  Montserrat and  Saint Martin have no national teams despite being CONCACAF members.

CONMEBOL (South America)

OFC (Oceania)

 
 
 
 *
 
 
 
 
 
 
 
 

* Not a FIFA member.

 has no national team despite being OFC member.

UEFA (Europe)

 
 
 
 
 
 
 
 
 
 
 
 
 
 
 
 
 
 
 
 
 
 
 
 
 
 
 
 
 
 
 
 
 
 
 
 
 
 
 
 
 
 
 
 
 
 
 
 
 
 
 
 
 
 

 San Marino has no national team despite being a FIFA and UEFA member.
Bold teams did not enter for 2023 FIFA Women's World Cup qualification despite being a FIFA and UEFA member.

See also

Women's association football
List of women's association football clubs
International competitions in women's association football
Geography of women's association football
List of association football competitions
List of men's national association football teams

References

 
 
Women's association football-related lists